Joensuu railway station (in Finnish: Joensuun rautatieasema) is located in Joensuu, North Karelia, Finland. The station was opened in 1894.

The station is served by passenger trains to Helsinki (via Lappeenranta, Kouvola and Lahti), Nurmes and Pieksämäki. The line to Helsinki via Lappeenranta is electrified, all other routes are operated by diesel hauled trains. The passenger train service to Nurmes was originally to close in 2016, but as of 2019 is still in service.

Passenger trains to Helsinki are mainly operated by InterCity or double-deck InterCity 2 carriages hauled by VR Class Sr1 locomotives or by Pendolino units.

See also
VR (Finnish Railways)
Joensuu Airport

External links

VR
VR – Joensuu station

References 

Railway stations in North Karelia
Railway stations opened in 1894
Railway station